Charles Frith may refer to:

 Charlie Frith (footballer) (1868–1942) English footballer
 Charlie Frith (1854–1919) New Zealand cricketer
 Charles H. Frith (1838–1912) American politician